Niels Leemhuis (born 28 September 1997) is a Dutch professional footballer who plays as a midfielder for Excelsior '31.

External links
 
 

1997 births
Living people
Dutch footballers
Heracles Almelo players
Eredivisie players
Association football midfielders
Sportspeople from Almelo
Footballers from Overijssel